A referendum on legalising web shops and establishing a national lottery was held in the Bahamas on 28 January 2013. Both proposals were rejected by voters.

Background
Gambling is currently illegal for Bahamian citizens. However, illegal gambling establishments known as "web shops" allow betting on American lottery numbers. The referendum had been a campaign promise of the Progressive Liberal Party prior to the 2012 general elections. After winning the elections, plans were announced in Parliament on 1 November 2012 to hold a referendum on legalising web shops on 3 December. However, on 16 November a further announcement was made that the national lottery question would also be asked and a new date of 28 January 2013 was proposed.

Legalising and regulating the web shops was supported by Prime Minister Perry Christie, who claimed it could raise $20 million a year in tax revenues. However, religious groups opposed the move.

Results

References

2013 referendums
2013 in the Bahamas
Referendums in the Bahamas
Gambling referendums